The 1953 British Mount Everest expedition was the ninth mountaineering expedition to attempt the first ascent of Mount Everest, and the first confirmed to have succeeded when Tenzing Norgay and Edmund Hillary reached the summit on 29 May 1953. Led by Colonel John Hunt, it was organised and financed by the Joint Himalayan Committee. News of the expedition's success reached London in time to be released on the morning of Queen Elizabeth II's coronation, on 2 June that year.

Background

Identified as the highest mountain in the world during the 1850s,
Everest became a subject of interest during the Golden age of alpinism, although its height made it questionable if it could ever be climbed.  In 1885, Clinton Thomas Dent's Above the Snow Line suggested that an ascent might be possible.  Practical considerations (and World War I) prevented significant approaches until the 1920s.  George Mallory is quoted as having said he wanted to climb Everest "Because it's there", a phrase that has been called "the most famous three words in mountaineering".  Mallory famously disappeared on Everest during the 1924 British Mount Everest expedition and his fate remained a mystery for 75 years.

Most early attempts on Everest were made from the north (Tibetan) side, but the Chinese Revolution of 1949, and its subsequent annexation of Tibet led to the closure of that route. Climbers began to look at an approach from the Nepalese side.

Leadership, preparations and training

John Hunt, a British Army Colonel, was serving on the staff at Supreme Headquarters Allied Powers Europe when to his surprise he was invited by the Joint Himalayan Committee of the Alpine Club and the Royal Geographical Society to lead the British Everest expedition of 1953. Eric Shipton had been widely expected to be the leader, because he had led the Mount Everest reconnaissance expedition from Nepal in 1951, as well as the unsuccessful Cho Oyu expedition in 1952, from which expedition most of the climbers selected had been drawn. However, the committee had decided that Hunt's experience of military leadership, together with his credentials as a climber, would provide the best chance for expedition to succeed. The British felt under particular pressure, as the French had received permission to mount a similar expedition in 1954, and the Swiss another in 1955, meaning that the British would not have another chance at Everest until 1956 or later. As Shipton wrote of his position presented to the Committee on 28 July 1952: "My well-known dislike of large expeditions and my abhorrence of a competitive element in mountaineering might well seem out of place in the present situation." This statement, according to George Band, "sealed his own fate".

Several members of the British expedition had a strong loyalty to Shipton and were unhappy that he had been replaced. Charles Evans, for instance, stated, "It was said that Shipton lacked the killer instinct – not a bad thing to lack in my view." Edmund Hillary was among those most opposed to the change, but he was won over by Hunt's personality and by his admission that the change had been badly handled. George Band recalls Committee member Larry Kirwan, the Director/Secretary of the Royal Geographical Society, saying that "they had made the right decision but in the worst possible way".

Hunt later wrote that the Joint Himalayan Committee had found the task of raising funds for the expedition challenging:

Initial training took place in Snowdonia in Wales during the winter. The Pen-y-Gwryd hotel was used as a base camp, and the team furthered their mountaineering skills on the slopes of Snowdon and the Glyderau. Testing of the oxygen equipment took place at the Climbers Club Hut at Helyg near Capel Curig.

The party departed for Nepal from Tilbury, Essex, England aboard the S.S. Stratheden bound for Bombay on 12 February, bar Tom Bourdillon, Dr Griffith Pugh, and Hunt, who was ill with an antrum infection. Evans and Alfred Gregory had flown on ahead to Kathmandu on 20 February, as the Advance Party. Hillary and Lowe approached Nepal from New Zealand, Lowe by sea and Hillary by air, as his "bees were in a busy state at that time of year". Although a sea passage was cheaper, Hunt stated that the main reason for choosing it over an air journey was "the further chance which life in a ship would provide for us to settle down as a team in ideal conditions, accompanied by no discomfort, urgency or stress".

In Kathmandu, the party was looked after by the British ambassador, Christopher Summerhayes, who arranged rooms with embassy staff, there being no hotels in Kathmandu at the time. In early March twenty Sherpas, who had been chosen by the Himalayan Club, arrived in Kathmandu to help carry loads to the Western Cwm and the South Col. They were led by their Sirdar, Tenzing Norgay, who was attempting Everest for the sixth time and was, according to Band, "the best-known Sherpa climber and a mountaineer of world standing". Although Tenzing was offered a bed in the embassy, the remaining Sherpas were expected to sleep on the floor of the embassy garage; they urinated in front of the embassy the following day in protest at the lack of respect they had been shown.

Expedition

The first party, together with 150 porters, left Kathmandu for Mount Everest on 10 March, followed by the second party and 200 porters on 11 March. They reached Thyangboche on 26 and 27 March respectively, and between 26 March and 17 April engaged in altitude acclimation.

Hunt planned for three assaults of two climbers each including "a third and last attempt" if necessary, although after two consecutive assaults; a wait for some days would be necessary to "recover our strength" and to replenish the camps. The plan for the first two assaults had been announced by Hunt on 7 May. The first assault party using closed-circuit oxygen equipment was to start from Camp VIII and aim to reach the South Summit (and if possible the Summit), composed of Tom Bourdillon and Charles Evans as only Bourdillon could cope with the experimental sets. The second assault party using open-circuit oxygen equipment was to be the strongest climbing pair, Ed Hillary and Tenzing Norgay; to start from Camp IX higher on the South Col. The third assault party would have been Wilf Noyce and Mike Ward.

If the (spring) expedition failed a post-monsoon autumn attempt would be undertaken (as the Swiss had done in 1952 – permission was for the whole year; although the Swiss arrived too late).

Base camp
The "Icefall party" reached Base Camp at 17,900 ft (5455 m) on 12 April 1953. A few days were then taken up, as planned, in establishing a route through the Khumbu Icefall, and once this had been opened teams of Sherpas moved tonnes of supplies up to Base.

Assault on the summit
A series of advanced camps were created, slowly reaching higher up the mountain. By 21 May, Noyce and the Sherpa Annullu (the younger brother of Da Tenzing) had reached the South Col, just under .

The first of two climbing pairs previously selected by Hunt, Tom Bourdillon and Charles Evans, set out for the summit on 26 May. They successfully made the first ascent of the  South Summit at 1 pm, coming within  of the final summit. They could see that between the South Summit and the Summit was a thin crest of snow and ice on rock, with a rock step (the Hillary Step). At  feet when they changed soda lime canisters, Evans' set had another problem which Bourdillon could not fix; Evans kept going but his breathing was painfully laboured. They reached the South Summit at 1 pm (at that time the highest summit climbed), but were forced to turn back at 1.20 pm after becoming exhausted, defeated by problems with the closed-circuit oxygen sets and lack of time.

On 27 May, the expedition made its second assault on the summit with the second climbing pair, the New Zealander Edmund Hillary and Sherpa Tenzing Norgay from Nepal. Norgay had previously ascended to a record high point on Everest as a member of the Swiss expedition of 1952. They left Camp IX at 6.30 am, reached the South Summit at 9 am, and reached the summit at 11:30 am on 29 May 1953, climbing the South Col route. Before descending, they remained at the summit long enough to take photographs and to bury some sweets and a small cross in the snow. They were not using open-circuit oxygen sets; after ten minutes taking photographs on the summit without his oxygen set on, Hillary said he "was becoming rather clumsy-fingered and slow-moving"  because of not using bottled oxygen. On returning from the summit, Hillary's first words to George Lowe were "Well, George, we knocked the bastard off". Stobart got the descending party to give no indication to those like Hunt and Westmacott, waiting in agony and suspense at Advance Base (Camp IV), that Hillary and Tenzing had succeeded until they were close enough for Stobart to catch the emotion of the moment on film.

News event
James Morris, the correspondent on the spot of The Times newspaper, heard the news at Base Camp on 30 May and sent a coded message by runner to Namche Bazaar, where a wireless transmitter was used to forward it as a telegram to the British Embassy in Kathmandu. Morris' encoded message to his paper read: "Snow conditions bad stop advanced base abandoned yesterday stop awaiting improvement". "Snow conditions bad" was the agreed code to signify that the summit had been reached; "advance base abandoned" referred to Hillary and "awaiting improvement" referred to Tenzing.
The message was received and understood in London in time for the news to be released, by coincidence, on the morning of Queen Elizabeth II's coronation on 2 June. The conquest of Everest was probably the last major news item to be delivered to the world by runner.

Aftermath

Returning to Kathmandu a few days later, the expedition learned that Hillary had already been appointed a Knight Commander of the Order of British Empire and Hunt a Knight Bachelor for their efforts. On 22 June, the Government of Nepal gave a reception for the members of the expedition at which the senior queen of the country presented Tenzing with a purse of ten thousand rupees, which was then about £500. Hillary and Hunt were given kukris in jewelled sheaths, while the other members received jewelled caskets. The same day, the Indian government announced the creation of a new Gold Medal, an award for civilian gallantry modelled on the George Medal, of which Hunt, Hillary and Tenzing would be the first recipients. On 7 June it was announced that Queen Elizabeth II wished to recognise the achievement of Tenzing, and on 1 July, 10 Downing Street announced that following consultation with the governments of India and Nepal the Queen had approved the award of the George Medal to him. Some commentators have seen this lesser honour as a reflection of the "petty bigotry" that men such as Norgay experienced during this period, although many other Indians and Nepalis had previously received knighthoods and it has been suggested that the Indian prime minister, Jawaharlal Nehru, refused permission for Norgay to be knighted. Hunt received his knighthood in July 1953, on his return to London.

Further honours continued to descend on the members of the expedition: the Hubbard Medal of the National Geographic Society, which had never before been awarded on a team basis, although individual medals were struck in bronze for Hunt, Hillary and Tenzing; the Cullum Geographical Medal of the American Geographical Society, the Founder's Medal of the Royal Geographical Society; the Lawrence Medal of the Royal Central Asian Society; and honorary degrees from the universities of Aberdeen, Durham, and London. In the New Year Honours list of 1954, George Lowe was appointed a Commander of the Order of the British Empire for his membership of the expedition; the 37 team members also received the Queen Elizabeth II Coronation Medal with MOUNT EVEREST EXPEDITION engraved on the rim.

The expedition's cameraman, Tom Stobart, produced a film called The Conquest of Everest, which appeared later in 1953  and was nominated for an Academy Award for Best Documentary Feature. 

Although Hillary and Tenzing represented their triumph as belonging to a team effort by the whole of the expedition, there was intense speculation as to which of the two men had actually been first to set foot on the summit of Everest. In Kathmandu, a large banner depicted Tenzing pulling a "semi-conscious" Hillary to the summit. Tenzing eventually ended the speculation by revealing in his 1955 (ghost-written) autobiography Man of Everest that Hillary was first. After this Hillary himself wrote that following his ascent of the 40-foot Hillary Step, lying just below the summit:

Shipton commented on the successful ascent: "Thank goodness. Now we can get on with some proper climbing."

Expedition participants
The expedition participants were selected for their mountaineering qualifications and also for their expertise in providing a number of other necessary skills and support services. While most were from the United Kingdom itself, they were also drawn from other countries of the British Empire and Commonwealth of Nations. The leader, Hunt, had been born in India.

The mountaineers were accompanied by Jan Morris (known at the time under the name of James Morris), the correspondent of The Times newspaper of London, and by 362 porters, so that the expedition in the end amounted to over four hundred men, including twenty Sherpa guides from Tibet and Nepal, with a total weight of ten thousand pounds of baggage.

See also
 Hillary Step
 Timeline of climbing Mount Everest
 List of 20th-century summiters of Mount Everest

Notes

References

Bibliography
 
  American edition called The Conquest of Everest (The Summit (Ch. 16, pp 197–209) by Hillary)

Further reading
 Edmund Hillary, High Adventure (London: Hodder & Stoughton, 1955); later reissued as High Adventure: The True Story of the First Ascent of Everest
 Edmund Hillary, View from the Summit: The Remarkable Memoir by the First Person to Conquer Everest (2000)
 George Band, Everest: 50 Years on Top of the World (Mount Everest Foundation, Royal Geographical Society and the Alpine Club, 2003)
 George Lowe and Huw Lewis-Jones, The Conquest of Everest: Original Photographs from the Legendary First Ascent (London: Thames and Hudson, 2013) 
 Wilfrid Noyce, South Col: One Man's Adventure on the Ascent of Everest (London: William Heinemann, 1954)
 Tom Stobart, Adventurer's Eye (Long Acre and London: Odham's Press, 1958)
 Mick Conefrey, Everest 1953: The Epic Story of the First Ascent (London: Oneworld, 2012)
 Harriet Tuckey, Everest: The First Ascent – How a Champion of Science Helped to Conquer the Mountain (Guilford, CT: Lyons Press, 2013 )
 Harriet Tuckey: Everest : the first ascent; the untold story of Griffith Pugh, the man who made it possible, London [u.a.] : Rider Books, 2013,

External links
 BBC article: "The 1953 technology used to climb Everest"

1953
Mountaineering in the United Kingdom
British Mount Everest expedition, 1953
British Mount Everest expedition, 1953
Expeditions from the United Kingdom
Science and technology in Nepal
1953 in science
Edmund Hillary
Tenzing Norgay